Bryan Matthew Sevilla (born February 7, 1986), known professionally by the stage name James Deen, is an American pornographic actor and director.

He entered the porn industry in 2004 at the age of 18. He gained attention due to his relatively slender build, lack of tattoos, and everyman appeal, bucking the stereotypical image of hypermasculine male actors in the pornography industry. In late 2015, multiple women came forward with allegations of sexual misconduct, including rape, against Deen, with the most notable being his former girlfriend Joanna Angel.

Early life 
Deen was born in Los Angeles County, California and raised in Pasadena. His father is a mechanical engineer and his mother is a computer electronic engineer, and one of them worked at the Jet Propulsion Laboratory.

According to Deen, performing in pornographic films was his ambition since he was in kindergarten. Around age 15, he left high school and spent two years homeless. He graduated from La Cañada High School in 2004. At 17, Deen moved in with his father. He worked at a Starbucks for two years and took classes at Pasadena City College.

Career 
After entering the pornography industry in 2004, he initially worked with older female performers. In 2009, he was named the "Male Performer of the Year" by AVN at the age of 22, making him the youngest actor to have won this award. Deen has a fan following among teenage girls, a demographic typically not associated with the pornographic industry. In February 2012, ABC Nightline aired the feature Porn's Boy Next Door, which included interviews with Deen and his fans. One fan described him as "the Ryan Gosling of porn".

In September 2012, Deen was a participant in a press conference, along with others opposing Los Angeles County Measure B, an initiative which would require condom usage in the pornographic film industry. Deen questioned the measure's constitutionality.

Deen's collaborations include work with NSFW site WoodRocket.com. As the host of original web series, James Deen Loves Food, Deen has been featured reviewing top restaurants, ordering every item on a drive-thru menu at once, and creating a $580 burrito.

In January 2013, Deen took to crowdfunding site Kickstarter.com to raise funds for the mainstream steampunk Western film Cowboys & Engines. Deen is listed as the producer of the Bryn Pryor vehicle. The campaign surpassed its goal of $100,000 in 58 days. Actors Malcolm McDowell, Richard Hatch and Walter Koenig have signed on to the project.

He performed in about 4,300 videos in his pornographic career.

In media 
In February 2013, Deen was invited to return to his alma mater, Pasadena City College, by professor Hugo Schwyzer to speak to students about his career. The appearance, initially open to the public, was restricted by college administrators due to "public-safety concerns" over "protesters". Deen was restricted to speaking to the students of Pasadena City College's "Navigating Pornography" class.

In April 2013, Deen delivered the keynote speech for the Sexual Health Fest at the University of Wisconsin–Madison.

Deen was featured in a July 2012 GQ multi-page article, chronicling his work and personal life. GQ interviewed Deen again for an article about his workout regimen, in which he credited healthy eating habits, a "Jew stomach" and lots of sex. In 2013, Deen was listed as the only male performer to make the CNBC Dirty Dozen list of the porn industry's popular stars.

In April 2013, Deen filmed a pornographic scene with reality television participant Farrah Abraham, who had been in one of the Teen Mom series. Deen indicated that he was asked to pretend to be dating Abraham as part of a ploy to market the scene as an accidentally released sex tape, but that he refused to do so, arguing, "If you're going to make a celebrity sex tape and try to pass it off as an amateur home video, you don't hire a well-known porn star!"

Deen co-starred with Lindsay Lohan in Paul Schrader's 2013 film The Canyons, written by Bret Easton Ellis. In July 2013, Deen teamed with American pornographic actress Andy San Dimas, adult app store MiKandi and adult industry news source XBIZ, to release the first adult video production recorded with Google Glass. Within 24 hours, the censored trailer reached one million views on YouTube.

Deen filmed a sex scene with Huffington Post blogger and comedian Jenn Tisdale in late 2013, in a New York City hotel room, after she responded to an open invitation by Deen on Twitter. In light of sexual assault allegations made against Deen in 2015, Tisdale addressed the issue by amending her original story about filming a sex video with Deen, saying she regretted contributing to the false image Deen projected of himself.

Deen has a sizable fan base; his fans, dubbed "Deenagers", have created social media fan pages on Tumblr, Pinterest and standalone fan sites. Deenagers regularly share and comment on Deen's work. In February 2013, Deen launched JamesDeenStore.com. In addition to Deen's films and adult novelties, the store features Deen's Baby Panda brand of clothing.

In January 2014, Deen joined the newly formed Adult Performer Advocacy Committee (APAC), which provides representation for performers within the adult film industry, protects performers' rights, reviews existing health and safety protocols, and initiates new ones as needed. As part of the committee's launch, APAC released a Porn 101 video. A DVD copy was released to all industry talent attending the recent Adult Entertainment Expo in Las Vegas, Nevada. Deen has served as Treasurer and served as Chairperson of APAC until December 2015, when he stepped down following accusations from fellow performers.

On June 25, 2014, Deen participated in a Reddit A.M.A. He received over 4,000 questions over the course of an hour, making Deen's AMA listed by Reddit as the most popular on the site as of the following morning.

Personal life 
From 2005 to 2011, Deen dated fellow pornography star Joanna Angel. In an interview with The Huffington Post from July 2013, porn actress Stoya stated that she was dating Deen. They dated from 2012 to 2014.

Deen is Jewish and identifies with Judaism as "a culture more than anything else." Deen identifies as a libertarian.

Rape and sexual misconduct allegations 
On November 28, 2015, Deen was accused on Twitter of rape by the pornographic actress and writer Stoya, with whom he had previously been in a romantic relationship. Deen denied the allegations, calling them "false", "egregious", and "defamatory". Deen's former girlfriend Joanna Angel was one of the first performers to tweet support for Stoya. On The Jason Ellis Show, Angel accused Deen of being abusive during their six-year relationship.

In total, nine women came forward with allegations of abuse and unnecessarily rough sex during scenes. The allegations included claims that Deen forcibly had anal sex with a woman during a non-anal scene, that he physically restrained and hit several women, and forced one woman's face into his crotch to "sniff his testicles". Amber Rayne said that during a shoot, Deen punched her in the face and caused her anus to bleed with violent anal sex.

Due to the allegations, Kink.com, Evil Angel, and HardX.com severed all ties with Deen, stating that "consent is sacrosanct". The Frisky cancelled Deen's sexual advice column and removed advertisements for and links to Deen's official site from previously published editions. Deen voluntarily resigned as chairman of the Adult Performer Advocacy Committee.

In December 2015, an article in The Daily Beast referred to Deen as the "Bill Cosby of porn". Deen later gave an interview to The Daily Beast where he stated he was "baffled" by the accusations and denied or offered counter-explanations for them.

In July 2017, director Maria Demopoulos filed a lawsuit against Deen for blocking the distribution of a documentary that addresses the numerous rape and sexual assault allegations against him by stealing legal releases from her office.

Awards

References

Further reading 
 Tracy Clark-Flory, A Male Porn Star Speaks, July 27, 2011, Salon. Retrieved October 29, 2014.
 ABC Nightline Interview
 GQ magazine issue, June 2012

External links 

 
 
 
 
 
 "James Deen Purchases Softball Team"
 James Deen Reddit Questionnaire (November 6, 2012)

1986 births
Living people
21st-century American male actors
American male bloggers
American bloggers
American libertarians
American male film actors
American male pornographic film actors
American male television actors
Pornographic film actors from California
People from Los Angeles County, California
Pasadena City College alumni
American people of Jewish descent
20th-century American Jews
21st-century American Jews